Roger A. Towberman is a senior non-commissioned officer of the United States Space Force who has served as the first chief master sergeant of the Space Force since April 3, 2020. He was also the service's first enlisted member, having transferred from the United States Air Force. He also concurrently served as the senior enlisted advisor of the United States Space Command from July 2019 to August 28, 2020.

As the senior enlisted advisor for the leadership of both the Space Force and United States Space Command, Towberman provides direction for the enlisted space force and represents their interests. He is also the personal advisor to the Chief of Space Operations, on all issues regarding the welfare, readiness, morale, and proper utilization and progress of all enlisted members assigned or detailed to the United States Space Force, the United States Space Command, and for other unified combatant commands around the world.

Early life and education
Towberman is the son of Ralph and Holly Towberman. He graduated from Cumberland High School in 1986.

Towberman has attended the following military education courses:
 1995 Pacific Air Forces Airman Leadership School, Hickam AFB, Hawaii
 2002 U.S. Air Forces in Europe Non-Commissioned Officer Academy, Kapaun AB, Germany
 2002 Joint Advanced Tactical Signals Intelligence Training Program, Naval Strike, Air Warfare Center, Fallon, Nev.
 2004 Associate in Communications Application Technology degree, Community College of the Air Force
 2006 U.S. Air Force Senior Noncommissioned Officer Academy, Maxwell AFB, Ala.
 2009 U.S. Air Force Chief Master Sergeant Leadership Course, Maxwell AFB, Ala.
 2014 Air Force Smart Operations for the 21st Century, University of Tennessee, Knoxville, Tenn.
 2014 Enterprise Leadership Seminar, University of North Carolina, Chapel Hill, N.C.

Military career

Towberman entered the United States Air Force in September 1990. He graduated from the cryptologic language analyst course at Goodfellow Air Force Base, Texas in May 1992. His background includes various duties as a ground and airborne cryptologic language and intelligence analyst. Throughout his career, he has filled myriad leadership roles at the squadron, group, wing, and numbered Air Force level, while stateside and deployed on Operations Joint Forge, Allied Force, Northern Watch, Southern Watch, Iraqi Freedom, Enduring Freedom, and Unified Protector. He is a Career Enlisted Aviator with more than 4,500 flying hours.

Assignments

Towberman has had the following military assignments:

 September 1990 – October 1990, trainee, Basic Military Training, Lackland AFB, Texas
 October 1990 – December 1991, student, Defense Language Institute, Presidio of Monterey, Calif.
 January 1992 – May 1992, student, Goodfellow AFB, Texas
 May 1992 – March 1997, Systems Operator and Collection Manager, Wheeler Army Airfield, Hawaii
 March 1997 – March 1999, C2 Network Analyst, Kelly AFB, Texas
 March 1999 – August 2007, Superintendent, Standardization and Evaluations, Flight Chief Airborne Operations, 488th Intelligence Squadron, RAF, Mildenhall, United Kingdom
 August 2007 – October 2009, Operations Superintendent, 338th Combat Training Sq, Offutt AFB, Neb.
 October 2009 – July 2010, Operations Superintendent, 488th Intelligence Sq, RAF Mildenhall, United Kingdom
 July 2010 – August 2011, Superintendent, 488th Intelligence Sq, RAF Mildenhall, United Kingdom
 August 2011 – May 2013, Superintendent, 55th Electronic Combat Group, Davis-Monthan AFB, Ariz. (April 2012 – November 2012, Superintendent, 455th Expeditionary Operations Group, Bagram, Afghanistan)
 May 2013 – September 2014, Command Chief Master Sergeant, 480th Intelligence, Surveillance and Reconnaissance Wing, Joint Base Langley-Eustis, Va.
 September 2014 – August 2017, Command Chief Master Sergeant, 25th Air Force, Joint Base San Antonio-Lackland, Texas
 August 2017 – November 2018, Senior Enlisted Advisor, Assistant Secretary of the Air Force (Manpower and Reserve Affairs), Pentagon, Washington D.C.
 November 2018 – December 2019, Command Chief, Air Force Space Command, Peterson AFB, Colo.
 July 2019 – August 2020, Command Senior Enlisted Leader, U.S. Space Command, Peterson AFB, Colo.
 February 2020–Present, Chief Master Sergeant of the Space Force, U.S. Space Force, Peterson AFB, Colo.

Awards and decorations

References

External links

 

Living people
Year of birth missing (living people)
Chief Master Sergeants of the Space Force
Recipients of the Defense Superior Service Medal
Recipients of the Legion of Merit